Gulsaira Momunova, in Kyrgyz: Гүлсайра Момунова (30 December 1937 – 12 August 2020) was a Kyrgyz journalist, translator and poet. In 2011, she was given the title 'People's Poet of Kyrgyzstan'.

Biography 
Momunova was born on 30 December 1937, in the village of Ken-Aral in the Bakay-Ata District of Kyrgyzstan. She graduated from school in Talas in 1955, and then, in 1960, from the Mayakovsky Women's Institute. She began work in 1961 as a journalist for the newspaper Советтик Кыргызстан (Soviet Kyrgyzstan), where she worked until 1969. From 1971 she worked as deputy editor for Кыргызстан (Kyrgyzstan). From 1973 until her retirement in 1993 she was editor of the magazine Кыргызстан аялдары (Women of Kyrgyzstan).

In 1964, Momunova published her first collection of poetry, entitled Тилек [Wish]. She wrote twenty collections of poetry during her career, two of which were translated to Russian. Her poetry is known for its folk style. In 1971, she became of member of the Kyrgyz National Writers' Union. In 1973, she made the first Kyrgyz translation of the Russian author I. Zhakanov's short story Returned Song.

Momunova died from kidney disease linked to COVID-19 complications in Bishkek, on 12 August 2020, during the COVID-19 pandemic in Kyrgyzstan. She was buried on 13 August, in the Ala-Archinsky cemetery.

Legacy 
In 2013, Momunova's 75th birthday was marked by an exhibition of her works at the National Library of Kyrgyzstan.

Awards 

 Honored Worker of Culture of the Kyrgyz Republic (1987)
 'Happy Week Medal': International Song Contest - Turkey (1996)
 Tugolbay Ata Literary Prize (2003)

Selected publications 

 Бабалардан уңгу башат (2012).

References

External links 

 BBC Kyrgyzstan: Ар жума күнү обого чыгуучу Би-Би-Си “Насыйкат” берүүсүндө aкын Гүлсайра Момунова.
 YouTube: Гүлсайра Момунова, Кыргыз Республикасынын эл акыны, Алыкул Осмонов атындагы сыйлыктын лауреаты
 YouTube: Эл акыны Гүлсайра Момунова акыркы сапарга узады... - Кыргызстан жаңылыктары

1937 births
2020 deaths
Kyrgyzstani poets
Kyrgyzstani women poets
Kyrgyzstani journalists
Kyrgyzstani women journalists
Women editors
Kyrgyz-language writers
People from Talas Region
Deaths from the COVID-19 pandemic in Kyrgyzstan